Group E of the 2006 FIFA World Cup began on 12 June and completed on 22 June 2006. Eventual champions Italy won the group and advanced to the round of 16 along with second-placed Ghana. The Czech Republic and the United States failed to advance. Due to the calibre of the teams involved, this was one of two groups at the 2006 World Cup considered to be a group of death (along with Group C).

Standings

 Italy advanced to play Australia (runners-up of Group F) in the round of 16.
 Ghana advanced to play Brazil (winners of Group F) in the round of 16.

Matches
All times local (CEST/UTC+2)

United States vs Czech Republic

Italy vs Ghana

Czech Republic vs Ghana
Tomáš Ujfaluši was sent off in the 65th minute after tripping Matthew Amoah in the penalty box from behind. Asamoah Gyan took the penalty kick but struck the post and then received a yellow card for taking the shot without the referee's permission.

Italy vs United States
Italy midfielder Daniele De Rossi was sent off in the 28th minute after elbowing U.S. striker Brian McBride in a rash challenge that left the American with blood all over his face and requiring three stitches under his left eye. FIFA banned De Rossi for four matches (allowing him to return in the final) and fined him 10,000 CHF (£4,500).

Czech Republic vs Italy

Ghana vs United States

References

E group
Group
Group
Czech Republic at the 2006 FIFA World Cup
Group